Marko Pöyhönen (born September 10, 1987) is a Finnish professional ice hockey forward who currently plays for EC VSV in the Austrian Hockey League (EBEL).

He formerly played with the Lahti Pelicans of the SM-liiga.

On 2 July 2019, Pöyhönen returned to the EBEL, agreeing to a one-year contract with Austrian club, EC VSV.

References

External links

1987 births
Living people
KHL Medveščak Zagreb players
Lahti Pelicans players
People from Hollola
HKM Zvolen players
Finnish ice hockey right wingers
Sportspeople from Päijät-Häme
Expatriate ice hockey players in Croatia
Finnish expatriate ice hockey players in Austria
Finnish expatriate sportspeople in Croatia
Finnish expatriate ice hockey players in Slovakia